Ibrahim Mogra is an imam from Leicester and former Assistant Secretary General of the Muslim Council of Britain.

Early life 
Mogra was born in 1965 into a family of Gujarati Indian origin and emigrated to the UK at the age of 18 to study and settle. He was educated at Darul Uloom Bury, Holcombe, Greater Manchester; Al-Azhar University, Cairo; and the School of Oriental and African Studies, London. He is the founder and Principal of Khazinatul-'Ilm, Madaris of Arabic and Muslim Life Studies, in Leicester.

Career
In 2000, he contributed to BBC Radio 2's Faith in The Nation examination of the afterlife amongst the main religious faiths. He has been a panelist on The Big Questions, a faith and ethics television programme broadcast live on BBC One.

He has contributed to and written for The Guardian.

In 2018, Mogra served on a panel of judges for the '21 for 21' interfaith awards, a collaborative project by The Jewish News, The Church Times and British Muslim TV.

Views

British Muslims and interfaith relations 
Mogra believes that for British Muslims "our loyalty to Britain must be unquestionable".

Mogra has been a representative for Jewish-Muslim relations appreciating the similarities of communities governed by a code of law and ethics (Torah and Qur'an) and religious festivals and holy days. Asked to choose a favourite film for The Clerics' Choice in The Daily Telegraph, Mogra picked The Message, explaining that "you see through the eyes of the camera, as the Messenger would have seen it".

He has worked closely with Abu Eesa Niamatullah, Strategic Director of the 1st Ethical Charitable Trust.

Mogra has also been an active supporter of the Armed Forces Muslim Association, appearing as a guest speaker and providing spiritual advice to Muslims serving in the British Military.

Grooming scandals 
In April 2013, Mogra took part in an interview on BBC Radio 4, condemning the men at the centre of the Rochdale sex trafficking scandal. He said that sexual grooming of non-Muslim girls by Muslim gangs was an abhorrent behaviour that was unacceptable regardless of race or religion. He expressed that as some of the perpetrators happened to be from a Muslim background, it was the duty of the entire Muslim community to condemn their actions. However he also cautioned that the paedophile scandal should be seen purely as criminal behaviour, warning that using labels of race and religion could "drive the problem deeper underground". Mogra also said that the Muslim Council was also working with different groups such as the National Society for the Prevention of Cruelty to Children, police and other Muslim groups to speak out against such crimes and assist in tackling the problem.

Boris Johnson and the niqab 
In 2018, responding to comments on the niqab by then Foreign Secretary Boris Johnson, Mogra criticised Johnson's choice of words, describing them as "insensitive." He added that Muslim women "have already been victims of violence on our streets," and that using such offensive language would make their situation worse. He also said that Muslims were "not against criticism of the faith," but that there are more important topics that affect Muslim communities, for which debate should be prioritised over what Muslim women may or may not wear.

Honours and achievements
In 2016, he was awarded the Hubert Walter Award for Reconciliation and Interfaith Cooperation by the Archbishop of Canterbury "for his sustained contribution to understanding between the Abrahamic faiths".

In January 2016 he was awarded an honorary Doctor of Letters by De Montfort University in recognition of his interfaith work and "the work he has done to build bridges between communities across the country and globally." Mogra said that he was "humbled and honoured" by the accolade.

References

British scholars of Islam
British imams
Living people
Gujarati people
Indian emigrants to England
British people of Gujarati descent
Imams in the United Kingdom
Indian imams
People educated at Darul Uloom Bury
Islamic scholars in the United Kingdom
Deobandis
People associated with De Montfort University
1965 births